John Louis Hairston (born August 27, 1944) is a former catcher/left fielder in Major League Baseball who played for the Chicago Cubs in the  season. Hairston batted and threw right-handed. He debuted on September 6, 1969, and played his final major league game on October 2, 1969.

Hairston posted a .250 batting average (1-for-4) in three games played.

Family
Hairston comes from the biggest major league baseball family.  He is the son of Sammy Hairston, a former Negro leaguer who later became the first black player in Chicago White Sox history; the brother of Jerry Hairston, Sr., and the uncle of Jerry Hairston Jr. and Scott Hairston.  The five Hairstons that have played in the majors set a record.  The two other three-generation MLB families have four members each:  the Boone family (Ray, Bob, Bret and Aaron) and the Bell family (Gus, Buddy, David, and Mike). Johnny Hairston was the first second-generation African American player in Major League Baseball.

See also
List of second-generation Major League Baseball players

External links

Cooperstown Confidential
MLB Players Association
Retrosheet

1944 births
Living people
Chicago Cubs players
Major League Baseball catchers
Major League Baseball left fielders
Baseball players from Birmingham, Alabama
African-American baseball players
Treasure Valley Cubs players
Quincy Cubs players
Lodi Crushers players
Southern Jaguars baseball players
San Antonio Missions players
Tacoma Cubs players
Birmingham A's players
Wichita Aeros players
21st-century African-American people
20th-century African-American sportspeople